Aïn M'lila  (Ayn Malīlah; which means "the white source", the root m-l-l being of Berber origin) is a town and commune in Oum El Bouaghi Province, Algeria. According to the 2008 census it has a population of 65,371. It is the home-town of Larbi Ben M'hidi, one of the most prominent Algerian leaders during the war of independence. It is the home of football club AS Ain M'lila that currently play in the Algerian Ligue Professionnelle 1 (first division).

Localities  of the commune 
The commune is composed of 24 localities:

History
The first people known to have settled in the region are the Zemouls. They were the oldest and most formidable cavalry which was established in Aïn M'lila on the road between Constantine and Batna during the Ottoman Empire ruling. The Zemouls were a war like tribe whose chief military and administrative bore the title of zemala caid. On an order of the Bey, they would take up arms, to ride and lend a hand, or to punish the rebels, or to facilitate the implementation of administrative measures. For each about fifty horsemen, was called a chaouch which had only a purely military authority. Under the last Bey, Hadj Ahmed, they had more than five hundred horsemen commanded by ten or fifteen chaouche, as circumstances require.

World War I
As Algeria was French many people from Algeria participated in the War.

Refer to French Algeria.

World War II
During the second world war a military airfield was built. It was built by the Army Corps of Engineers on a flat, dry lakebed at an altitude of 2580 feet, designed for heavy bomber use by the United States Army Air Force Twelfth Air Force during the North African Campaign with concrete runways, hardstands and taxiways.

Refer to Ain M'lila Airfield.

References

Communes of Oum El Bouaghi Province
Algeria